Ghatixalus is a genus of frogs in the family Rhacophoridae, subfamily Rhacophorinae. They are endemic to the Western Ghats of southern India. They are the sister taxon to a larger clade consisting of Chiromantis, Feihyla, Taruga, Polypedates, and Rhacophorus. The name of the genus combines words "Ghats" and "Ixalus". The former refers to the Western Ghats, and the latter to now-abandoned genus name that lives as the suffix in many generic names for rhacophorid frogs.

Description
adults (male SVL 38.8–82 mm, female 58.1–66.7 mm) in snout-vent length. They have a dorsal color pattern with dark brown prominent blotches. Eggs develop in foam nests followed by a free-swimming tadpole stage. Their habitat is associated with mountain streams throughout their life cycle.

Distribution and natural history
This exclusively Shola forest specialist genus is distributed only in the high elevations of Nilgiris and Anaimalai-Palnis, only above 1600 m asl. Most of the sightings were near streams and streamside often on bare ground, grass clumps on ground or rocks nearby. Although belonging to rather arboreal frog family, these frogs are terrestrial animals.

Species
There are only 3 recognized species in the genus Ghatixalus:
 Ghatixalus asterops Biju, Roelants, and Bossuyt, 2008 endemic to Upper Palni Hills, Anaimalai and High Ranges.  
 Ghatixalus magnus Abraham, Mathew, Cyriac, Zachariah, Raju and Zachariah, 2015 endemic to the Anaimalai Hills, High Ranges, Cardamom Hills, Meghamalai and Pandalam Hills   
 Ghatixalus variabilis (Jerdon, 1854) endemic to Upper Nilgiri Hills

The Palakkad Gap is believed to be a prominent biogeographic barrier that has caused speciation between the sister species G. asterops and G. variabilis.

References

External links

 
Rhacophoridae
Amphibians of Asia
Endemic fauna of the Western Ghats
Taxa named by Sathyabhama Das Biju
Amphibian genera